Gurbachan Singh Randhawa (born 6 June 1939, in Punjab Nangli, Amritsar) is a former Indian athlete who won a gold medal at the 1962 Asian Games in decathlon. He participated in the 1960 and 1964 Olympics in 110 hurdles, high jump and decathlon. He finished fifth in the 110 hurdles at the 1964 Tokyo Olympics with a timing of 14.07 seconds. He was honoured with the Arjuna Award in 1961 thus becoming the first athlete from the country to get the award and with the Padma Shri in 2005. His biography 'Uddna Baaz' is written by Navdeep Singh Gill.

See also
Athletics in India

References

External links
 
 
 The Randhawas never retire 
 Randhawa, a rare breed 

1939 births
Living people
Indian male hurdlers
Indian decathletes
Indian male high jumpers
Olympic athletes of India
Athletes (track and field) at the 1960 Summer Olympics
Athletes (track and field) at the 1964 Summer Olympics
Asian Games gold medalists for India
Asian Games medalists in athletics (track and field)
Athletes (track and field) at the 1962 Asian Games
Commonwealth Games competitors for India
Athletes (track and field) at the 1966 British Empire and Commonwealth Games
Recipients of the Arjuna Award
Recipients of the Padma Shri in sports
Athletes from Amritsar
Panjab University alumni
Medalists at the 1962 Asian Games
20th-century Indian people